Paris is the capital of France, which may consist of :

 the City of Paris
 Greater Paris, administratively named Métropole du Grand Paris
 the Paris region, administratively named Île-de-France region

Paris may also refer to:

People
Paris (surname), a list of people and fictional characters
Paris (given name), a list of people and fictional characters
Count of Paris, a title held by senior members of the House of Orléans, and a list of the titleholders

Mythological or fictional characters
Paris (mythology), a prince of Troy in Greek mythology
Count Paris, a character in Shakespeare's play Romeo and Juliet
The Great Paris, stage name of a fictional character on the television series Mission: Impossible

Places

Canada
Paris, Ontario, a community
Paris, Yukon, a former community

United States
Paris, Arkansas, a city
Paris, Idaho, a city
Paris, Illinois, a city
Paris, Indiana, an unincorporated community
Paris, Iowa, an unincorporated community
Paris, Kentucky, a city
Paris, Maine, a town
Paris, an unincorporated community in Green Charter Township, Michigan
Paris, Mississippi, an unincorporated community
Paris, Missouri, a city
Paris, New Hampshire, an unincorporated community
Paris, New York, a town
Paris, Portage County, Ohio, an unincorporated community
Paris, Stark County, Ohio, an unincorporated community
Paris, Oregon, an unincorporated community
Paris, Pennsylvania, a census-designated place
Paris, Tennessee, a city
Paris, Texas, a city
Paris, Virginia, an unincorporated community
Paris, Wisconsin (disambiguation), several Wisconsin localities
Paris Township (disambiguation), several US localities
Beresford, South Dakota, a city formerly called Paris
Loraine, California, an unincorporated community formerly called Paris
Paris Mountain, South Carolina - see Paris Mountain State Park
Paris Mountain, Virginia

Other places
Paris, Denmark, a hamlet in Jutland
Paris, Kiribati, an abandoned settlement on Kiritimati Island in Kiribati
París, Herrera, Panama, a corregimiento or subdistrict
París, Lajas, Puerto Rico, a barrio
Paris Basin, a geological region of France
Paris Peak, Anvers Island, Antarctica
3317 Paris, a minor planet named after the legendary figure of the Trojan War

Media

Film and television
Paris (1926 film), an MGM film starring Charles Ray, Joan Crawford, and Douglas Gilmore
Paris (1929 film), a "lost" production of the 1928 Cole Porter Broadway musical
Paris (1937 film), a French comedy film
Paris (2003 film), an American thriller film
Paris (2008 film), directed by Cédric Klapisch
Paris (1979 TV series), starring James Earl Jones
Paris (1994 TV series), a British sitcom
Paris, fictional setting for Peter Weir's 1974 film The Cars That Ate Paris
Paris, France (film), a 1994 Canadian comedy-drama directed by Jerry Ciccoritti
Paris, Texas (film), a 1984 drama directed by Wim Wenders

Music

Artists
Paris (band), American rock music power trio formed in 1975
Paris (rapper) (born 1967), Oakland black nationalist rap artist
PVRIS, American rock band previously called Paris
Paris, an early name of Poison, a glam metal band formed in the 1980s
Paris, an early 1980s British band featuring Andy Hill

Musicals
Paris (1928 musical), a Cole Porter musical
Paris (2003 musical), a musical written by Australian rock musician Jon English

Albums
Paris (Marc Lavoine album), a 1991 album by Marc Lavoine
Paris (Malcolm McLaren album), a 1997 concept album by Malcolm McLaren
Paris (La Oreja de Van Gogh album), 2004
Paris (Paris album), 1976
Paris (Paris Hilton album), Paris Hilton's debut album
Paris (Putumayo album), a 2006 world music compilation album
Paris (Supertramp album), a 1980 double-disc live album by Supertramp
Paris (The Cure album), a 1993 live album by The Cure
Paris (Zaz album), a 2014 album by Zaz

Songs
"Paris" (The Chainsmokers song), 2017
"Paris" (Friendly Fires song), 2008
"Paris" (Kanye West and Jay-Z song), 2011
"Paris", by The 1975 from I Like It When You Sleep, for You Are So Beautiful yet So Unaware of It, 2016
"Paris", by Dido from Life for Rent, 2003
"Paris", by Groove Armada from Soundboy Rock, 2007
"Paris", by Ingratax, 2021
"Paris", by Kate Nash from My Best Friend Is You, 2010
"Paris", by Kungs, 2019
"Paris", by Magic Man from Before the Waves, 2014
"Paris", by Moondog from Sax Pax for a Sax, 1997
"París", by La Oreja de Van Gogh from El viaje de Copperpot, 2000
"Paris", by Sabrina Carpenter from Singular: Act 1, 2018
"Paris", by Taylor Swift from Midnights, 2022
"P A R I S", by BT from Emotional Technology, 2003

Writing
Paris (novel), historical novel by Edward Rutherfurd, first published in 2013
Paris: A Poem, a 1920 modernist poem by Hope Mirrlees
Paris, BN, lat. 4404, a medieval manuscript

Science and technology
Paris (plant), a genus of plants
Parkin-interacting substrate (PARIS), aka ZNF746, a protein/gene involved in Parkinson's disease
Paris Group of French nuclear scientists 1939–40, see Tube Alloys
Paper Aircraft Released Into Space, aviation project
.paris, an Internet top-level domain for the city of Paris, France
Paris, a variant of the AMD Sempron computer processor

Ships
French battleship Paris, launched in 1912 and scrapped in 1956
, various steamships
SS Paris II, a French military ship sunk in 1917 off Kemer, Turkey

Retail and hospitality
Paris (retail), a Chilean department store chain formerly known as Almacenes París
Paris Las Vegas, a hotel and casino

Other uses
Paris (plant), a genus of plants
Paris (horse) (foaled 1803), a British thoroughbred racehorse
Paris Agreement, international agreement on responding to climate change
Paris meetings, agreements and declarations (disambiguation)
Paris FC, a French football club
Morane-Saulnier MS.760 Paris, a French jet trainer and liaison aircraft
Judgement of Paris, a Greek myth
París (Mexico City Metrobús), a BRT station in Mexico City

See also
Pari (disambiguation)
Parisian (disambiguation)
Parisii (disambiguation)
Parris (disambiguation)
Parizh (lit. Paris), several rural localities in Russia
Parys (disambiguation)
Prais (disambiguation)